In the mathematical field of topology, a hyperconnected space or irreducible space is a topological space X that cannot be written as the union of two proper closed sets (whether disjoint or non-disjoint). The name irreducible space is preferred in algebraic geometry.

For a topological space X the following conditions are equivalent:
 No two nonempty open sets are disjoint.
 X cannot be written as the union of two proper closed sets.
 Every nonempty open set is dense in X.
 The interior of every proper closed set is empty.
 Every subset is dense or nowhere dense in X.
 No two points can be separated by disjoint neighbourhoods.

A space which satisfies any one of these conditions is called hyperconnected or irreducible.  Due to the condition about neighborhoods of distinct points being in a sense the opposite of the Hausdorff property, some authors call such spaces anti-Hausdorff.

An irreducible set is a subset of a topological space for which the subspace topology is irreducible. Some authors do not consider the empty set to be irreducible (even though it vacuously satisfies the above conditions).

Examples 

In algebraic geometry, taking the spectrum of a ring whose reduced ring is an integral domain is an irreducible topological space—applying the lattice theorem to the nilradical, which is within every prime, to show the spectrum of the quotient map is a homeomorphism, this reduces to the irreducibility of the spectrum of an integral domain. For example, the schemes , are irreducible since in both cases the polynomials defining the ideal are irreducible polynomials (meaning they have no non-trivial factorization). Another non-example is given by the schemewhere  is an irreducible degree 4 homogeneous polynomial. This is the union of the two genus 3 curves (by the genus–degree formula)

Hyperconnectedness vs. connectedness 
Every hyperconnected space is both connected and locally connected (though not necessarily path-connected or locally path-connected). 

Note that in the definition of hyper-connectedness, the closed sets don't have to be disjoint. This is in contrast to the definition of connectedness, in which the open sets are disjoint.

For example, the space of real numbers with the standard topology is connected but not hyperconnected. This is because it cannot be written as a union of two disjoint open sets, but it can be written as a union of two (non-disjoint) closed sets.

Properties 
The nonempty open subsets of a hyperconnected space are "large" in the sense that each one is dense in X and any pair of them intersects. Thus, a hyperconnected space cannot be Hausdorff unless it contains only a single point.
Every hyperconnected space is both connected and locally connected (though not necessarily path-connected or locally path-connected).
Since the closure of every non-empty open set in a hyperconnected space is the whole space, which is an open set, every hyperconnected space is extremally disconnected.
The continuous image of a hyperconnected space is hyperconnected. In particular, any continuous function from a hyperconnected space to a Hausdorff space must be constant. It follows that every hyperconnected space is pseudocompact.
Every open subspace of a hyperconnected space is hyperconnected.
 Proof: Let  be an open subset. So at least one of them must be empty.
 More generally, every dense subset of a hyperconnected space is hyperconnected.
Then . Since  is hyperconnected, one of the two closures is the whole space , say .
A closed subspace of a hyperconnected space need not be hyperconnected.
 Counterexample:  with  an algebraically closed field (thus infinite) is hyperconnected in the Zariski topology, while  is closed and not hyperconnected.
The closure of any irreducible set is irreducible.
Since this is true for every non-empty open subset,  is irreducible.

Irreducible components

An irreducible component in a topological space is a maximal irreducible subset (i.e. an irreducible set that is not contained in any larger irreducible set). The irreducible components are always closed.

Every irreducible subset of a space X is contained in a (not necessarily unique) irreducible component of X.  In particular, every point of X is contained in some irreducible component of X.  Unlike the connected components of a space, the irreducible components need not be disjoint (i.e. they need not form a partition). In general, the irreducible components will overlap.

The irreducible components of a Hausdorff space are just the singleton sets.

Since every irreducible space is connected, the irreducible components will always lie in the connected components.

Every Noetherian topological space has finitely many irreducible components.

See also
 Ultraconnected space
 Sober space
 Geometrically irreducible

Notes

References
 

Properties of topological spaces